David Raikuna (born 24 August 1987 in Suva, Fiji), is a professional rugby union player. He currently plays for Stade Rochelais in the Top 14. He has also played for the New Zealand sevens team. Raikuna plays predominantly as a winger, although has the ability to cover centre and fullback.

Career
Raikuna made his debut for Counties Manukau in 2010, before signing with North Harbour for the 2011 season. In the same year, he was selected for the New Zealand sevens team. He was signed by the Blues for the 2012 season and made his Super Rugby debut against the Crusaders in the first round of the competition.

References

External links 
 Blues Profile
 North Harbour Profile
 

Blues (Super Rugby) players
Counties Manukau rugby union players
1987 births
Living people
Fijian rugby union players
Rugby union wings
North Harbour rugby union players
Sportspeople from Suva
New Zealand international rugby sevens players
I-Taukei Fijian people